Ruby Skye PI is a Canadian web series created by Jill Golick. The first two seasons, The Spam Scam and The Haunted Library, were shown on YouTube over the course of a few months and has since been shown on Koldcast, Vimeo, blip.tv, DigitalChickTV, Clicker and MinglemediaTV. Ruby Skye PI has earned plaudits from numerous festivals, including the ITN Festival, the Banff World Media Festival, and the LA Web Festival. The web series follows the detective work of Ruby Skye as she tries to solve mysteries using her keen powers of observation.

Cast 
 Madison Cheeatow as Ruby Skye, budding detective.
 Marlee Maslove as Hailey Skye, advocate for a water bottle ban, tech wizard and Ruby's little sister.
 Elena Gorgevska as Diana Noughton, the one who mysteriously hates Ruby Skye.
 Scott Beaudin as Edmund O'Fyne, the mysterious new boy who's been seen around the O'Deary Library.

Recurring characters
 Kevin Gutierrez as Griffin Lane, Ruby's best friend.
 Ali Adatia as Vinnie, the new janitor at the Dragon Academy.
 Ryan Egan as Flint Shearson, Ms. Springer's new beau.
 Nawa Nicole Simon as Ms. Springer, former military commander, avid bird watcher and computer teacher.
 Kirklynne Garrett as Mrs. Gooje, Ruby's neighbour.
 Raj Verman as Gary, owner of the local ice cream shop.
 Rodrigo Fernandez-Stoll as Griffin's Father, an unemployed musician.
 Pui-Ling Tam as Constable Officer
 Sarah Higgins as Library Woman
 Laska Sawade as Shop Keeper
 Rosemary Dunsmore as Ava O'Deary, the eccentric owner of the O'Deary Library
 Samantha Wan as Ophelia Bedelia, the librarian at the O'Deary Library
 Laura Decarteret as Lillian O'Shyte, Ava's odd relative, who wants to turn the library into an adults-only condo. 
 Jordan Prentice as Henry O'Henry, Ava's relative who has a penchant for speaking with a British accent. 
 Geri Hall as Gifted Sarah
 Shaun Shetty as Finch
 Samii Folliot as Cocoa, one of The Mint Chip Girls, an all girl rock group.
 Sydney Klune as Dylan, one of The Mint Chip Girls, an all girl rock group.
 Dana Edmonds Wong as Ulla, one of The Mint Chip Girls, an all girl rock group.

Production 
Ruby Skye P.I. is the brainchild of the digital pioneer Jill Golick, and is directed by Kelly Harms and produced by Karen Walton, Kerry Young and Golick under the flag of her company, Story2.OH. Golick and Julie Strassman, Golick's writing partner, crafted the story and then developed the character of Ruby to go along with it. They applied to the Independent Production Fund and then wrote the scripts when they had the money. They had the green light from IPF on June 18, 2010, and shot all 12 episodes of the first season in early August of that year.

Transmedia 
Ruby Skye P.I. has a unique relationship with its audience in that the creators are immediately accessible. They have a dedicated Twitter account, Facebook group, Tumblr account and YouTube page. Their official website allows audience members to interact with the show, from reading blog entries relating to content to playing games of rock, paper, scissors. Despite their openness, Jill Golick, speaking at a Writers Guild of Canada event, said of Ruby Skye's audience that they "created opportunities on the website for our audience to participate and be part of a community and we'll do that much more with the storytelling next time around".

As of the second season, Ruby Skye P.I. has several websites that lend to the transmedial experience. These include O'Deary Library, O'Deary Puzzles, blogs for Hailey, Diana and The Mint Chip Girls, as well as several other ways to participate with the series on a deeper digital level.

Critical reception 
Those Video Guys states that "Madison Cheeatow is a fantastic actress and she really has the charisma to hold together a series that is purely based on her and her character". James Floyd Kelly, part of GeekDad on Wired.com, said of the series, "As I continued to watch the series and be introduced to key characters, I was happy to see that the character of Ruby (and her friends and family) don’t seem to fall into stereotypes." Kelly went onto say that she had "to give credit to the team that has developed Ruby Skye, P.I. — it’s got to be very hard to write, film, and release a show for young adults that doesn’t take the easy route to try to get our kids’ attentions. With so many television shows containing violence, sex, and harsh language, it's actually quite nice to watch a well-written and professionally edited web series. The dialogue is realistic (you won't find those 2-minute-long monologues here), the mystery is interesting (and based on a real-world scam), and the characters are likable." Clicker.com likens Ruby Skye P.I. to hit teen shows from the 1990s. They said: "The mysteries may be silly—ranging from a Nigerian money scam to a sham wedding—but you feel it every time Ruby makes a mistake, or when her friends turn on her a la “Harriet.” And true to those wonderful ‘90s shows, the adults are hilariously bumbling and over the top, from villains to supporting characters."

IPF executive director Andra Sheffer referring to Ruby Skye PI's building audience, said, "It’s not like TV or film, where you have the launch night and sit back, hoping the audience comes. This is the continual building of an audience."

Awards 
 New York Television Festival - Best Family Pilot
 Interactive Rockie for Best Online Program - Children & Youth June 15, 2011
 Best Shorts Award of Excellence
 IndieFest Award - Best Shorts Award of Excellence: Web series
 Outstanding Interactive Narrative Comedy: Jill Golick (Creator); Kerry Young, Steven Golick, Karen Walton, Jill Golick (Producers)
 Outstanding Lead Actress – Interactive Narrative Comedy: Madison Cheeatow
 Outstanding Supporting Actress – Interactive Narrative Comedy: Nawa Nicole Simon
 Outstanding Writing – Interactive Narrative Comedy: Julie Strassman-Cohn, Jill Golick
 Outstanding Directing – Interactive Narrative Comedy: Kelly Harms
 Outstanding Cinematography – Interactive Narrative Comedy: Alex Dacev
 Outstanding Editing – Interactive Narrative Comedy: Jennifer Essex-Chew, Ben Manthorpe, Mike Reisacher, Tiffany Beaudoin
 Outstanding Score – Interactive Narrative Comedy: Studiocat Sound and Music, Composer
 Three Telly Awards
 Youth Media Alliance Award of Excellence for Best Original Interactive Content
 ITN Fest's Best International Web series

Nominations 
 Golden Sheaf Award - Children and Youth Productions
 New Media Film Festival Audience Choice Award
 WGC Screenwriting Awards Finalist - Shorts and Webseries
 Indie Intertube Awards: Best Series to Show to Your Mother
 Indie Soap Awards: Best Writing, Best Editing, Best Visual Effects, Best Makeup, Best Original Score
 IAWTV Awards 2011: Best Website

Festival selections 
 Official selection in the New York Television Festival
 First Glance Philadelphia
 ITVFest (Los Angeles)
 Mississauga Independent Film Festival
 ITN Film Festival (Los Angeles)
 L.A. Web Festival
 Sharp Cuts (Guelph)
 Yorkton Film Festival
 Marseilles Web Festival 2013

Episode synopsis

Season One: The Spam Scam

Season Two: The Haunted Library 
Season two began on October 10, 2012.

References

External links 
  Ruby Skye PI - WATCH THE AWARD-WINNING SERIES

2010 web series debuts
2012 web series endings
Canadian drama web series
Mystery web series